Oleksandr Churilov (born 6 June 1984) is a professional Ukrainian football goalkeeper who plays for German club SC Eltersdorf.

Career
Churilov is a product of the youth team systems of Metalurh Mariupol and FC Shakhtar Donetsk. His first trainer was Volodymyr Kolach. He signed a contract with SC TavriyaFC Illichivets in January 2014.

References

External links
 
 

1984 births
Sportspeople from Mariupol
Living people
Ukrainian footballers
Association football goalkeepers
FC Mashynobudivnyk Druzhkivka players
FC Uholyok Myrnohrad players
FC Ihroservice Simferopol players
FC Olimpik Donetsk players
FC Feniks-Illichovets Kalinine players
FC Dacia Chișinău players
FC Zorya Luhansk players
FC Zirka Kropyvnytskyi players
FC Bukovyna Chernivtsi players
FC Tytan Armyansk players
FC Naftovyk-Ukrnafta Okhtyrka players
FC Hoverla Uzhhorod players
FC Mariupol players
FC Ternopil players
SC Eltersdorf players
Ukrainian Premier League players
Ukrainian First League players
Moldovan Super Liga players
Ukrainian Second League players
Landesliga players
Regionalliga players
Oberliga (football) players
Ukrainian expatriate footballers
Expatriate footballers in Moldova
Ukrainian expatriate sportspeople in Moldova
Expatriate footballers in Germany
Ukrainian expatriate sportspeople in Germany